Joseph T. "Cap" Shaw (1874–1952) was the editor of Black Mask magazine from 1926 to 1936.

Life and career
Before becoming Black Mask editor, Shaw had worked as a newspaper reporter and as a soldier in World War I, attaining the rank of captain (Shaw's friends gave him the nickname "Cap"). Shaw was also a professional fencer, and even won an Olympic medal for fencing.
 Under his editorship, Black Mask published many works of crime fiction now recognised as classics of the genre, by authors such as Dashiell Hammett, Raymond Chandler, and Erle Stanley Gardner.

Chandler greatly admired Shaw's ability to encourage Black Mask writers, claiming in a letter, "We wrote better for him than we could have written for anybody else."

Despite Black Mask's critical and commercial popularity, Shaw was eventually fired from the magazine, succeeded by Fanny Ellsworth. Shaw then
worked as a literary agent, though without notable success.

Shaw was a writer himself, producing short stories, novels, and articles.

Works

Novels
 Derelict (New York: Alfred A. Knopf, 1930)
 Blood on the Curb (Steeger Books, 2020)
 It Happened at the Lake (Steeger Books, 2022)

Short stories
 "Alkali Ethics," The Scrap Book, May 1911 [first known publication]
 "Close Shootin’," Pioneer Tales, July 1928

Articles
 "Do You Want to Become a Writer? or Do You Want to Make Money?," Writer's Digest, May 1934.
 "Dialogue," Writer's Digest, June 1939.

Editor
 The Hard Boiled Omnibus: Early Stories from Black Mask (includes introduction) (New York: Simon and Schuster, 1946)

Further reading
Bodin, Ed. "An Interview With Joseph T. Shaw," The Author and Composer, August 1932.
Lenniger, August. "Black Mask" (interview), Writer's Digest, October 1929.
 Safire, William. "The Way We Live Now: 4-30-00: On Language; Dirigiste", New York Times, April 30, 2000.
Shaw, Milton. Joseph T. Shaw: The Man Behind Black Mask. Black Mask, 2019. Biography, by his son.

References

American magazine editors
American crime fiction writers
Literary agents
American male fencers
1874 births
1952 deaths
Place of birth missing
American male novelists
American male non-fiction writers